Radio BM is a Bosnian commercial radio station, broadcasting from Zenica.

Radio BM began broadcasting on 17 April 1997, and it was formatted as variety radio station with Bosnian music and national news.

Frequencies
The program is currently broadcast at 7 frequencies:
 Zenica-Doboj Canton  
 Sarajevo 
 Tuzla Canton 
 Travnik 
 Doboj 
 Central Bosnia Canton 
 Vitez

See also 
List of radio stations in Bosnia and Herzegovina

References

External links 
 Communications Regulatory Agency of Bosnia and Herzegovina

Radio stations in Bosnia and Herzegovina
Radio stations established in 1997